Angie Rocio Orjuela Soche (born 9 May 1989) is a Colombian long distance runner who specialises in the marathon. She competed in the women's marathon event at the 2016 Summer Olympics and won a bronze medal at the 2019 Pan American Games in the women's marathon event. In 2020, she competed in the women's half marathon at the 2020 World Athletics Half Marathon Championships held in Gdynia, Poland.

She represented Colombia at the 2020 Summer Olympics.

Personal bests

5,000 m – 16:45.67 (2012), Brutus Hamilton Invitational
10,000 m – 33:27.22 (2019), Mt. SAC Relays
10K run – 34:16 (2016), Girardot, Colombia
Half marathon – 1:12:07 (2020), Half Marathon Championships
Marathon - 2:29:12 (2020), Valencia Marathon

References

External links
 

1989 births
Living people
Colombian female long-distance runners
Colombian female marathon runners
Athletes (track and field) at the 2016 Summer Olympics
Athletes (track and field) at the 2020 Summer Olympics
Olympic athletes of Colombia
Competitors at the 2018 Central American and Caribbean Games
Central American and Caribbean Games bronze medalists for Colombia
Athletes (track and field) at the 2019 Pan American Games
Pan American Games bronze medalists for Colombia
Pan American Games medalists in athletics (track and field)
Central American and Caribbean Games medalists in athletics
Medalists at the 2019 Pan American Games
Sportspeople from Bogotá
21st-century Colombian women